Acacia acuminata subsp. acuminata is a perennial shrub or tree.  Common names for it include jam and raspberry jam.  It is native to Western Australia.

See also
 List of Acacia species

References

acuminata subsp. acuminata
Fabales of Australia
Acacias of Western Australia
Trees of Australia
Plant subspecies
Taxa named by George Bentham